is a JR West Geibi Line station located in Shimokobara, Kōta-chō, Akitakata, Hiroshima Prefecture, Japan. The station name is derived from being the "entrance" to the former Yoshida-chō.

History
1915-04-28: Yoshidaguchi Station opens
1987-04-01: Japan National Railways is privatized, and Yoshidaguchi Station becomes a JR West station
November 1992: The current station building was completed

Station building and platforms
Yoshidaguchi Station features one raised island platform, capable of handling two lines simultaneously. The station is a multi-purpose meeting building named "Pratt House."

Environs
Yoshida Post Office
Yoshida Kōri Mountain Castle Ruins, a historical monument, former castle of the daimyō Mōri Motonari
Akitakata Municipal Kōta Elementary School
Akitakata Municipal Yoshida Elementary School
Hiroshima Prefectural Yoshida High School
Yoshida Police Station
Akitakata Municipal Offices

Highway access
 Hiroshima Prefectural Route 37 (Hiroshima-Miyoshi Route)
 Hiroshima Prefectural Route 212 (Yoshidaguchi Teishajō Route)

Connecting lines
All lines are JR West lines. 
Geibi Line
Kōtachi Station — Yoshidaguchi Station — Mukaihara Station

External links
 JR West

Geibi Line
Railway stations in Hiroshima Prefecture